Oh Chong-song (or Oh Chung-sung) is a North Korean defector. Oh is one of a few defectors who have defected to South Korea via the Joint Security Area (JSA). Prior to his defection, Oh was an industrial engineer. South Korean investigators concluded Oh "impulsively" defected.

Defection 
Oh defected from North Korea on November 13, 2017. During his escape, he drove a car directly up to the Military Demarcation Line (MDL) dividing North and South Korea and crashed, apparently losing a wheel. He then exited the car and sprinted across the MDL under close-range gunfire, collapsing on the South Korean side under cover of a low wall, meters away from the MDL. After being rescued by South Korean soldiers, Oh was transported in a helicopter from the U.S. Eighth Army's 2nd Combat Aviation Brigade, to the Ajou University Hospital in Suwon. Having lost half of his blood from five gunshot wounds received from North Korean soldiers during his escape, his condition required an immediate surgery operation upon arrival at the hospital to save his life.

Reaction 
North Korean soldiers violated the Korean Armistice Agreement during the incident by firing shots across the MDL into South Korea. Following these events, North Korean guards in the Joint Security Area were replaced. Additional measures were taken to prevent similar defections. A trench was dug at the site where Oh's vehicle had broken down and a new gate was installed along the road to Panmunjom.

Health
While Oh was in surgery for his gunshot wounds, doctors found large parasitic worms in his digestive tract, one of which was 27 cm long. The parasites were Ascaris lumbricoides worms. Oh was treated by surgeon Lee Guk-jong at the Ajou University Hospital's intensive care. Oh was later transferred to a military hospital. The surgery and treatment of Oh cost the South Korean government 65 million won ($60,800). South Korea's Channel A reported that an unnamed South Korean intelligence agent claimed that one of the four North Korean soldiers who defected in 2017 had anthrax antibodies in his system; however, the South Korean defense ministry did not confirm the report, and stated that none of the four soldiers are believed to have worked in North Korea's biochemical warfare unit. A South Korean intelligence official familiar with Oh's case reported to MBN that Oh may be showing signs of post-traumatic stress disorder. Oh could not recall his defection during interrogation.

Alleged confession
According to an unnamed source quoted by the South Korean newspaper Donga Ilbo, Oh allegedly confessed to South Korean investigators that he had committed a crime in North Korea, which "caused a death" or "led to the killing of people", depending on the source.

In the media
The Washington Free Beacon called Oh the 2017 man of the year. CNN has made a special documentary on the defection of Oh. In 2019,  NBC did a short update interview with Oh.

Family
According to Sankei Shimbun, Japanese officials have confirmed that Oh is the son of a North Korean major general.

See also

 Conrad Schumann, East German soldier who defected to West Germany in 1961
 Korean People's Army
 List of North Korean defectors in South Korea
 Schießbefehl, East German rules of engagement for defectors attempting to flee

References

North Korean defectors
Living people
1990s births
North Korean engineers
People from North Hwanghae